Isfahan Provincial League is the premier football league of Isfahan Province and is 5th in the Iranian football pyramid after the 3rd Division.It is part of the Vision Asia program.

References

External links 
 Official website

Sport in Isfahan Province